Bros are an English band formed in 1986 in Camberley, Surrey. The band originally consisted of twin brothers Matt and Luke Goss, and their friend Craig Logan, who attended Collingwood School in Camberley. The band was managed by former Pet Shop Boys manager Tom Watkins. They achieved chart success and a large teenage fanbase in 1988 with songs such as "When Will I Be Famous" and "I Owe You Nothing". Early the following year, Logan quit the band and the Goss twins continued as a duo. After two more albums the band split up in 1992.

Bros are estimated to have sold 16 million records worldwide. In 2017, the Goss twins reunited to perform two dates as Bros at the O2 Arena in London.

History

Early years
Luke Goss and Matt Goss (born 29 September 1968 in Lewisham, London) had settled in Camberley, Surrey, after their parents had split up and their mother had found a new boyfriend, who bought Luke an electronic drum kit and Matt a saxophone, noticing their interest in music. The twins attended Collingwood College, where they became part of a band called Blue. At school they met Craig Logan (born 22 April 1969 in Kirkcaldy, Fife, Scotland) who was playing bass guitar in another school band, Stillbrook. Logan recalled that the Goss brothers came to his house one evening to say they had split from their band, and asked Logan to join them in a new group. Logan agreed, and the trio went through a variety of names for the group before settling on Gloss.

The group were noticed by Bob Herbert, who had ambitions to break into the music business as a manager – Herbert's son Chris was a classmate of the trio at Collingwood. Herbert allowed the group to practise in his summer house and paid for them to record demos, but he was unable to sign them to a contract as they were under 18 years old.

During this period Gloss had met Nicky Graham, a songwriter and producer. Graham was working and writing songs with music manager Tom Watkins, and he suggested that Watkins meet the group. Although he was unimpressed with either their look or their music, Watkins realised that he could shape the group into a boy band for the teen girl market, with Graham and Watkins writing the songs for them. Gloss split from Herbert, and signed a contract with Watkins and his management company as soon as they turned 18. Watkins renamed the band Bros, and he and Graham wrote the group's songs under the pseudonym of "The Brothers", in order to create the impression that the Goss brothers had written the songs themselves.

Success
Bros's debut single, "I Owe You Nothing", was released in August 1987, but it only peaked at number 80 in the UK Singles Chart. However, their breakthrough came with the release of their second single, "When Will I Be Famous?", in November 1987. The song reached number two in the UK, and number one in Ireland. The song also reached the top ten in 10 other countries across Europe and Australia, and peaked at number 10 in the US Billboard Hot Dance Club Play chart.

Bros followed up the success of "When Will I Be Famous?" with their third single, "Drop the Boy". Like its predecessor, it also peaked at number two in the UK and was certified Silver by the BPI. and at number one in Ireland. as well as reaching the top ten in Australia, New Zealand, Norway, Switzerland and West Germany.

Bros released their debut album Push on 28 March 1988. Push entered the UK Albums Chart at number two. Although it never reached number one, the album was eventually certified quadruple platinum in the UK, as well as double platinum in Australia, platinum in New Zealand, and gold in France, Germany, Spain and Switzerland. A deluxe 3-CD edition of Push was reissued in 2013 by Cherry Pop records for its 25th anniversary, featuring bonus tracks.

Bros reissued a remixed version of "I Owe You Nothing" as a single in June 1988, which became their only number one single in the UK. The song peaked at number two in Ireland and in the top ten in eight other countries across the world, as well as giving them their second top ten hit on the Billboard Hot Dance Club Play chart. Two further singles were released from Push, "I Quit" in September 1988, which entered the UK charts at number four, and "Cat Among the Pigeons", which was released in November 1988 as a double A-side with a version of the Christmas carol "Silent Night" and entered the UK charts at number two.

Their first UK tour, known as Bros Push Live, sold out 14 shows within an hour of the tickets going on sale. Due to the demand, extra dates were added. 

The group's popularity was named "Brosmania" by the music press, and their following of teenage girls were known as "Brosettes". In September 1988 the Metropolitan Police had to close off part of Oxford Street in central London when an overwhelming number of fans turned up to a record signing by the band at the flagship store of record shop HMV. Bros had over six million fans worldwide join the band's fan club, known as the Bros Front. With such demand for merchandise and fans wanting to talk to their idols, a phone line was set up, with 70,000 fans using the service within the first month.

Logan left the band in early 1989, due to several bouts of illness, including chronic fatigue syndrome, and the fact he could no longer walk and was being assisted on and off stage. Logan was admitted to hospital for six weeks, and once released from hospital he spent a further six months of rehabilitation to learn to walk again. Logan decided that the pressure of stardom was no longer for him and told Matt and Luke he was thinking of leaving the band. He appeared with the brothers at the 1988 Smash Hits Poll Winners Party; this was his final appearance as a member of Bros. He appeared on the BBC1 television programme Wogan discussing why he had left the band. During the interview Logan talked about the legal action he took against the management of Bros over unpaid royalties, but confirmed he left the band due to illness.

Bros continued as a duo, with Matt Goss and Luke Goss continuing with the sold-out world tour titled 'The Global Push', where the band played to fans in Australia, Japan, mainland Europe and the UK.

After a short break recovering from their Global Push Tour, Bros went back to the recording studio and released their second album, The Time. The album was released on 16 October 1989 and reached number 4 in the UK Albums Chart. Bros released several tracks from the album as singles, including "Too Much", "Chocolate Box", "Madly in Love", and "Sister".

Bros did a one-off concert, "Bros in 2 Summer", which was seen by over 77,000 fans at Wembley Stadium in August 1989. The support acts for the show were Salt 'n' Pepa and Debbie Gibson.

In 1991 Bros released their third and final album, Changing Faces, before the band split up in 1992. They released two tracks from the album: "Are You Mine?", reaching number 12 in the UK and "Try", which got to number 27. The album was not highly publicised and entered the chart at number 18.

Bros achieved eleven top 40 singles and three top 20 albums in the United Kingdom. Worldwide, the group is estimated to have sold 16 million records. The band never had commercial success in the US, where they remain relatively unknown.

Careers after Bros
Matt Goss began a solo career during the 1990s, enjoying chart success with singles "The Key" and "If You Were Here Tonight", and had his own Vegas Residency at The Palms, Caesars Palace and The Mirage.

Luke Goss moved to the US and became a film actor, appearing in blockbuster hits such as Blade II and Hellboy II: The Golden Army.  He starred in the UK film Interview with a Hitman in 2012 and released his directorial debut Your Move in 2018.

Craig Logan became a songwriter and later an artist manager following his departure from the band in 1989. At the time he was going out with singer Kim Appleby and co-wrote many of her solo songs. From 2006 to 2010 he was the head of RCA Records in the UK, before launching his own management company.

Reunion
On 1 July 2008, singer Matt Goss told BBC News that he had spoken to the other members of the band and in principle they had agreed to reform, feeling that he and his bandmates "are finally at a place" where they could reunite. However, his brother Luke denied any plans of taking part in a reunion. On 14 September 2010, Matt Goss stated that the band would not be reuniting in the near future, saying that the moment had passed.

On 19 August 2017 — 28 years to the day since the band's original farewell concert at Wembley Stadium. — Matt and Luke Goss played a 30th anniversary Bros concert at London's O2 Arena. Craig Logan wished the Goss brothers success with the concerts, but confirmed he was not interested in taking part in the reunion. A UK tour was scheduled, with a second date at the O2 Arena and shows in Manchester, Glasgow, Birmingham and Newcastle upon Tyne, but all the dates except the two shows in London and the show in Manchester were later cancelled, with the band blaming "unforeseen logistical circumstances".

A documentary film of the brothers' reunion and the rehearsals and lead-up to the first concert at the O2 Arena, titled Bros: After the Screaming Stops, was shown on 18 October 2018 as part of the BFI London Film Festival and given a limited cinema release on 9 November 2018, with a DVD and digital release on 12 November. The film debuted at number one on the UK's Official Music Video Chart. It received its television debut on BBC Four on 23 December and became one of that year's Christmas television highlights due to its subsequent popularity on BBC iPlayer.

Following the documentary's success, the duo played another concert at London's O2 Brixton Academy on 5 July 2019, followed by further UK tour dates. They also planned to re-record their debut album Push in a more contemporary style, and to release an album of new material in the future.

Awards and nominations

Discography

Studio albums

Compilation albums

On the week ending 9 April 2020, Bros: Gold entered the UK Official Physical Albums Chart at No.8 based on sales of CDs, vinyl and other formats.

Remix albums
The Best Remixes (1991, Japan only)

Singles

Music videos
1987 – "I Owe You Nothing"
1987 – "When Will I Be Famous?"
1988 – "Drop the Boy"
1988 – "I Owe You Nothing" (reissue)
1988 – "I Quit"
1988 – "Cat Among the Pigeons"
1988 – "Silent Night"
1989 – "Too Much"
1989 – "Chocolate Box"
1989 – "Sister"
1990 – "Madly in Love"
1991 – "Are You Mine?"
1991 – "Try"

Videography
Bros's first video album, Push Live Tour, was released mid-1988 on VHS, and LaserDisc in Japan; it was recorded at the Hammersmith Apollo. Their second video release, Push Over, was a collection of music videos for singles taken from their Push album. These music videos, together with others recorded later by the duo, were also published on their third video album The Big Picture in 2004.

 The Big Push Tour Live (1988)
 Push Over (1989)
 The Big Picture (2004)
Filmography 
Bros: After the Screaming Stops (2018)

Concert tours

The Big Push Tour

The Global Push Tour

In 2 Summer (concert)

Bros Live

References

External links
 Welcome 
 Bros discography at Discogs
 Matt Goss Official website

Brit Award winners
English boy bands
English pop rock music groups
English vocal groups
Teen pop groups
Musical groups established in 1986
Musical groups disestablished in 1992
Musical groups reestablished in 2017
Musical groups from London
British musical trios
Vocal trios
Twin musical duos
CBS Records artists